WVT may refer to:
 Waterview Tower, a skyscraper in Chicago
 Web visitor tracking
 Watervliet Arsenal